Jeffrey Kent Severson (born September 16, 1949) is a former American football safety in the National Football League for the Washington Redskins, Houston Oilers, Denver Broncos, and the St. Louis Cardinals.  He played college football at Long Beach State University and was drafted in the 12th round of the 1971 NFL Draft.  Severson played in Super Bowl VII.

Jeff also coached with Pro Football Hall of Fame Coach George Allen at Long Beach State for the 1990 season.

External links
NFL stats

1949 births
Living people
Sportspeople from Fargo, North Dakota
American football safeties
Long Beach State 49ers football players
Washington Redskins players
Houston Oilers players
Denver Broncos players
St. Louis Cardinals (football) players
Wilson Classical High School alumni